In Hindu epic Mahabharata, Bhima is the second among the five Pandavas. The Mahabharata relates many events that portray the might of Bhima. Bhima was born when Vayu, the wind god, granted a son to Kunti and Pandu. After the death of Pandu and Madri, Kunti with her sons stayed in Hastinapura. From his childhood, Bhima had a rivalry with his cousins Kauravas, especially Duryodhana. Duryodhana and his uncle, Shakuni, tried to kill Bhima multiple times. One was by poisoning and throwing Bhima into a river. Bhima was rescued by Nāgas and was given a drink which made him very strong and immune to all venom.

After the event of Lakshagriha, the Pandavas and their mother decided to hide from Hastinapura. During this period Bhima slew many Rakshasa including Bakasura and Hidimba. Bhima had three wives  Hidimbi, the Rakshasi sister of Hidimba, Draupadi, who was married to five Pandavas because of Kunti's misunderstanding, and Valandhara, a princess of Kashi Kingdom. Ghatotkacha, Sutasoma and Savarga were his three sons.

After the brothers founded the city of Indraprastha, Bhima went to Magadha and killed its mighty ruler, Jarasandha. Later Yudhishthira was invited by Duryodhana to play a game of dice, in which he lost. The Pandavas along with their wife, Draupadi, were sent into exile for thirteen years. During their exile, Bhima met his spiritual brother, Lord Hanuman. For incognito, the Pandavas chose the Matsya Kingdom to hide. There Bhima disguised himself as a cook named Vallabha. He also killed the general of the kingdom, Kichaka, as he tried to molest Draupadi. During the Kurukshetra War, Bhima alone killed a hundred Kaurava brothers in the battle. He was considered to have the physical strength of 10,000 elephants approximately.

Etymology

The word Bhīma in Sanskrit means "fearful", "terrific", "terrible", "awful", "formidable", "tremendous".

His other names are ( Dandum Wacana, Kusuma Waligita, Pondan Paksajandu and Satria Jodipati ) –
Bhima was popularly known as Bhimasena (भीमसेन) – he who is equivalent to a formidable army
 Vrikodara (वृकोदर) – wolf bellied; he who has a thumb-sized fire in the stomach
 Jarasandhajit (जरासन्धजित्) – he who won over Jarasandha
 Hidimbabhid (हिडिम्बभिद्) – he who pierced Hidimba
 Kichakajit (कीचकजित्) – he who defeated Kichaka
 Jihmayodhin (जिह्मयोधिन्) – fighter against falsehood
 Ballava (बल्लव) – cook

Birth and early life

Along with other Pandava brothers, Bhima was trained in religion, science, administration and military arts by the Kuru preceptors, Kripa and Drona. Specifically, he became a master in using the mace. Bhima's strong point throughout the epic remains his towering strength. He was so wrathful and strong that it was impossible to even for Indra to subdue him in a battle.

Bhima was also renowned for his giant appetite – at times, half of the total food consumed by the Pandavas was eaten by him.

Bhima and Hanuman were celestial brothers, as both of them are Vayu's children. He prayed to Vayu and idolized his brother Hanuman. He used to play practical jokes on the Kaurava brothers; he used to engage in wrestling bouts where he out-powered them with consummate ease.

His repeated failures and fecklessness against Bhima angered Duryodhana so much that he wanted him dead. He hatched a cunning plot where he poisoned Bhima's food and drowned him in river Ganga. Thankfully, the Naga king Vasuki saved Bhima and also apprised him of Duryodhana's hatred for him. It is also Vasuki who bestowed him the immense strength of ten thousand elephants.

Duryodhana with his counsellor Purochana hatched a plan to burn the Pandavas alive at a lac palace Lakshagraha at Varnavat that Duryodhana had built there (lacquer is highly inflammable). Thanks to prior notice from Vidura, the Pandavas managed to escape out from the palace with Bhima played a major role in carrying all five of them (Kunti and brothers) and escaping to safety. Bhima also barricaded the palace of Purochana and set fire to it, thereby ensuring Purochana became a victim of his own evil plot.

Kunti and the Pandavas were living in agyatavaasa (living incognito) after they escaped from the murder plot (Kunti suggests they be incognito to avoid further problems from the Kauravas). During their stay at Ekachakra village (present-day Chakar Nagar, 35 km south of Etawah, Uttar Pradesh) they came to know of a demon, Bakasura, who troubled people by eating members of their village and their provisions. The powerful Bhima brought his might to the fore and killed Bakasura, much to the delight of the villagers.

Marriage and children

At the time Bhima kills the demon Hidimba who was king of demons of the forest Kamyaka, he meets his sister Hidimbi; they eventually get married and have a son, Ghatotkacha. Hidimbi promises Kunti that she and Ghatotkacha will stay out of the Pandavas' lives and away from the luxuries of court. When Bhima killed the demon Hidimba, he became the King of Kamyaka for 5 years. In Mahabharata, the demon army from Kamyaka fought the war alongside Pandavas.

The Pandavas attended the Swayamvara of Drupada princess, Draupadi. The Pandavas, led by Arjuna, were successful at the Swayamvara. With his brothers, he was married to Draupadi, who gave birth to a son, Sutasoma. At a later stage, Bhima also married princess Valandhara, the daughter of the king of Kasi, and had a son named Savarga. Among Bhima's three sons, Sarvaga (who later ascended to the throne of Kashi) did not participate in the Kurukshetra war, Sutasoma was killed by Ashwatthama and Ghatotkacha was killed by Karna.

Conquest for Rajasuya

When Yudhishthira became emperor of Indraprastha he sent his four younger brothers out in different directions to subjugate kingdoms for the Rajasuya sacrifice. Bhima was sent out to the East, since Bhishma thought the easterners were skilled in fighting from the backs of elephants and in fighting with bare arms. He deemed Bhima to be the most ideal person to wage wars in that region. The Mahabharata mentions several kingdoms to the east of Indraprastha which were conquered by Bhima.
Key battles include his fights with:
 Jarasandha of the Magadha empire: Jarasandha was a major hurdle before  Yudhishthira when the latter decided to perform the Rajasuya yajna. As Jarasandha was a powerful warrior, it was extremely necessary for Pandavas to eliminate him. Lord Krishna, Bhima and Arjuna disguised as Brahmins travelled to Magadha and met Jarasandha. After a formal meeting, Jarasandha enquired about their intentions. Krishna, Bhima and Arjuna revealed their actual identification. Lord Krishna then challenged Jarasandha for a duel and gave him the freedom to choose any one belligerent. Jarasandha selected Bhima for a duel. Both Bhima and Jarasandha were accomplished wrestlers. The duel continued for several days and neither of them was willing to give up. Bhima overpowered Jarasandha after a long duel and almost took Jarasandha to death but Bhima was unable to kill Jarasandha. When Bhima looked at Krishna for guidance, Krishna picked a twig and dissected it into two halves and threw the parts in opposite directions. Bhima complied with his instructions and dissected the body of Jarasandha. He threw the dissected parts in opposite directions. Jarasandha was killed as two halves of the body could not conjoin. Jarasandha held 100 kings in prison and made them ready to sacrifice them. He was known to have a rivalry with Krishna and he wanted the 101st king to be given for the sacrifice. Since Bhima killed Jarasandha, the 100 kings became the supporters of Yudhishthira and accepted him as the Chakravarti Samrat.
Dasarnas: where the king called Sudharman with his bare arms fought a fierce battle with Bhima, who later appointed the mighty Sudharman as the first-in-command of his forces.
Karna: Bhima encountered Karna with the help of his forces. Bhima then subjugated Karna and brought him under his sway.
 Sishupala of Chedi Kingdom, (who welcomed Bhima and hosted him for thirty days)
 Matsya, Maladas and the country called Madahara, Mahidara, and the Somadheyas, Vatsabhumi, and the king of the Bhargas, as also the ruler of the Nishadas and Manimat:
 Southern Mallas and the Bhagauanta mountain.
 Sarmakas and the Varmakas

Exile

After Yudhishthira succumbed to Shakuni's challenge in the game of dice, the Pandavas were forced into exile for 13 years, one of which was in anonymity. The exile period in the forests, saw the Pandavas come face to face with many rakshasas and Bhima played a crucial role in the epic in rescuing his brothers every time.

Slaying Kirmira
Right at the start of the exile, in the woods of Kamyaka, the Pandavas encountered the demon Kirmira, the brother of Bakasura and a friend of Hidimba. A fierce battle ensued between Bhima and the demon, where the two equally matched fighters hurled rocks and trees at each other. Eventually, Bhima emerged victorious.

Saugandhika's search and encounter with Hanuman

Once in Badarikasrama forest, Draupadi scented the Saugandhika flower and was deeply attracted to it. The lotus species was not to be located easily so Bhima went in search of the flower and ended up at Kubera's palace. He was stopped in his tracks by the rakshasas called Krodhavasas, but he defeated them all and reached the lotus pond. He also slew the rakshasa Maniman a wicked demon, who had in the past, incurred a curse from Rishi Agastya.

Being unused to the water of the pond, Bhima fell asleep on its shore. Later, the Pandavas arrived with Krishna and Draupadi in search of Bhima. They met Kubera who offered them baskets of Saugandhika lotuses and sent them on their way. Kubera was especially happy, as the slaughter of Maniman had relieved him of the curse too.

During his search for the Saugandhika flower, Bhima saw an old monkey, lying in the path, whose long tail was outstretching the region. Bhima in pride asked the monkey to move the tail blocking his path. But, the monkey replied saying he's too old and had no strength to do that and requested that Bhima do it instead. Outraged at being commanded by someone inferior to him, he grabbed the monkey's tail with his left hand with intention of swirling him via it and sending him in the air and to his surprise he wasn't able to move it. So, he used both his hands and all his might but wasn't able to raise it. Defeated and surprised he asked the monkey for forgiveness with joined hands. The monkey revealed its true-self, Hanuman (his brother, as both were Vayu's children). Bhima received Hanuman's blessing in the form of increased strength. He warned Bhima of the path ahead, warned him of the prophesized war, blessed him of victory in all his endeavours and left.

Killing Jatasura
In another minor incident in the epic, Jatasura, a rakshasa disguised as a Brahmin abducted Yudhishthira, Draupadi and the twin brothers, Nakula, and Sahadeva during their stay at Badarikasrama. His objective was to seize the weapons of the Pandavas. Bhima, who was gone hunting during the abduction, was deeply upset when he came to know of Jatasura's evil act on his return. A fierce encounter followed between the two gigantic warriors, where Bhima emerged victorious by decapitating Jatasura and crushing his body.

Cook at Virata's kingdom

Along with his brothers, Bhima spent his last year of exile in the kingdom of Virata. He disguised himself as a cook named Ballava (within themselves Pandavas called him Jayanta).

Defeating Jimuta

Once during a great festival, people from neighbouring countries had come to the Kingdom of Virata. There was a wrestling bout where a wrestler from a different state, Jimuta proved to be invincible. Much to the delight of King Virata and his subjects, Bhima challenged Jimuta and knocked him out in no time. This greatly enhanced the reputation of the Pandavas in unfamiliar territory.

Kichaka Vadha

Kichaka, the army commander of Virata, tried to sexually assault Draupadi, who was under the guise of a maid named Sairindhri. Draupadi reported this incident to Bhima. Bhima covered himself with silk robes. He slew him the moment he tried to touch him. Kichaka was crushed and slaughtered into a meatball by Bhima. Later Kichaka's allies plotted to murder Sairindri, but Bhima vanquished all of them.

Susarma's defeat
The archenemy of Virata was King Susharma of the Trigarta Kingdom, under the aegis of Duryodhana, waged a battle against Virata by stealing the cows in his kingdom. Bhima leads the other Pandavas and Virata and helped to rout the army of Susarma easily. Before he was about to strangle Susarma to death, Yudhishthira told him to spare him.

By this time, the 13-year exile period was completed and the rivalry between the siblings was renewed.

During the Kurukshetra War
Before the battle had begun, Bhima suggested that Satyaki would lead the Pandava forces, as their general, but Yudhishthira and Arjuna opted for Dhrishtadyumna. The charioteer of Bhima's Chariot was Vishoka while the flag bore the image of a gigantic lion in silver with its eyes made of lapis lazuli and his chariot was yoked to horses as black as bears or black antelopes. He wielded a celestial bow named Vayavya- which was given by Vayu (Wind God), had a massive conch named Paundra and also possessed a huge mace whose strength is equivalent to a hundred thousand maces (presented by Lord Hanuman). Bhima distinguishes himself in battle several times throughout the war; some of Bhima's major engagements during the war include:

2nd day
On the 2nd day of the war, he encounters the Kalinga army. He slays Kalinga King Shrutayusha's son Sakradeva, and the two Kalinga general Satya and Satyadeva. He also kills Ekalavya's son Ketumat. He also defeated and nearly killed Duryodhana in wrestling but failed to kill him due to sunset.

14th day
On the 14th day of the war, Bhima defeated Drona by smashing his chariot eleven times and penetrating the Kaurava formation in order to aid Arjuna in his quest to slay Jayadratha.  Duryodhana sends a legion of elephants to check Bhima's advance, and Bhima thoroughly destroys the army, leaving a bloody trail of elephant entrails.
Durmasena (Dussasana's son), on Duryodhana's order, attempted to stop Bhima. But Bhima in his bloodlust killed Durjaya by hitting him on the head. Bhima also defeated Alambusha on the 14th day. On the same day, Bhima and Karna fought several times. During one such battle Bhima while chasing Karna encountered Vikarna along with seven Kourava brothers. They were sent by Duryodhana to protect Karna. In the battle that ensued Vikarna was killed. Bhima grieved Vikarna's death praising his noble deeds.
The outcome of Bhima and Karna's battles changed each time. In the end Bhima was finally defeated by Karna but spared due to Kunti's oath. Thirty one of Duryodhana brothers were also killed by Bhima that day. Bhima slew Bahlika, the King of the Bahlika kingdom on the night of the fourteenth day.

15th day

On the 15th day of the war Bhima attacked Karna in a group but he was quickly defeated and forced to retreat. Bhima's son Ghatotkacha was killed by Karna. Bhima saw the day as a failure as he failed to save his son from Karna. Later, he killed an elephant called Ashwatthama as a plan for killing Drona. Later Bhima along with Satyaki even saved Dhrishtadyumna from Ashwatthama covering his escape. They attacked Ashwatthama together before ultimately retreating from the battlefield after being defeated by Kripi Kumara.

16th day

The 16th day of the Kurukshetra war is completely dedicated to Bhima. He dominated other warriors and became a hero on the 16th day of the war.

Bhima was the only warrior who refused to submit to the invincible Narayanastra weapon launched by Ashwatthama on the 15th day of the war and was quickly defeated by it.

On the 16th day of the war, Karna was appointed to protect Dushyasana from the clutches of Bhima. Soon Karna picked up a sword and rushed on to Bhima. Soon they engaged in a sword fight, when Bhima was about to stab Karna defeating him, Karna's son Banasena came in aid of his father. On seeing Banasena, Bhima got angered as his own son Ghatotkacha was slain by Karna. Banasena challenged Bhima and soon attacked Bhima with mace. Bhima brutally but fairly killed Banasena in front of Karna. Bhima killed Banasena by hitting him several times on the head, chest and abdomen. Seeing his son's fate; Karna grabbed a mace and attacked Bhima. Still, in anger, Bhima and Karna fought several times. But Karna eventually won in the end and Bhima retreated. Bhima asked Karna to take his son's body to perform funerals and later fight with Arjuna. Bhima had a fierce fight with Ashwatthama who repeatedly called him a coward because he slew an elephant. They hurled several powerful arrows at each other and the duel was witnessed by Hanuman, who is the son of Vayu like Bhima and Amsha of Shiva like Ashwatthama. The battle was so intense and astonishing that it was being witnessed by all the celestial beings aswell, eventually both of them fell unconscious on their respective chariots by the end of that terrifying battle. Later Bhima headed to kill Dussasana.

Bhima defeated and brutally killed Dushasana on the sixteenth day of the war in front of Duryodhana. Bhima killed Dussasana by separating and cutting his hands from the body. Bhima beat Dussasana in the heart region. Bhima squeezed blood from Dussasana's heart and dressed Draupadi's hair. Bhima also drank the remaining blood.

17th day
On the seventeenth day of the war Karna and Bhima engaged in several fights, at first Bhima fought hard, but Karna prevailed in the end, Bhima fled from the battlefield. Dhritarashtra and Gandhari's children were killed by Bhima.

Death of Duryodhana

After 18 days of the war, Duryodhana went and hid under a lake. After given the option to choose the opponent, Duryodhana chose Bhima as his opponent. Bhima clashed with Duryodhana in a mace duel. Though Bhima had superior strength, Duryodhana had the upper hand. Lord Krishna knew that it is not possible to kill Duryodhana because Duryodhana's body turned as tough as a diamond with power in Gandhari's eyes. Krishna instructed Bhima to hit Duryodhana's thighs through gestures. Bhima did as Krishna directed & successfully broke the thighs of Duryodhana. Enraged at this sight, Balarama grabbing his plough paced to attack Bhima, but was stopped by Krishna. Krishna convinced his brother by narrating the unjust death of Abhimanyu and evils committed by Duryodhana.

Later years and death
After the war, Dhritarashtra was enraged by Bhima's slaying of all his sons. When the Pandavas arrive at Hastinapur to claim the kingdom and pay their respects, Krishna, sensing his anger, placed an iron statue of Bhima in front of Dhritarashtra. When embracing Bhima, Dhritarashtra crushed the statue into pieces, but later realized his folly and apologized. He later hugged Bhima wholeheartedly.

Yudhishthira appointed Bhima as the commander-in-chief of Hastinapur. Upon the onset of the Kali Yuga, Bhima and the other Pandavas retired. Giving up all their belongings and ties, the Pandavas made their final journey of pilgrimage to the Himalayas.

On the journey, the group, one-by-one, begins to fall. When Bhima tires and falls down, he asks his elder brother why he, Bhima, is unable to complete the journey to heaven. Yudhishthira explains his brother's vice of gluttony. In some versions of the story, Yudhishthira points out Bhima's boastfulness, pride, and battle-lust as the reasons for his fall.

Outside Indian subcontinent

Indonesia 

in Indonesia, bhima or Bima (Indonesian and Javanese: Raden Werkudara or Werkudara ) is a well-known figure in the world of wayang in Javanese and also Balinese culture. Bima is brave, steadfast, strong, obedient, honest and wise and considers everyone to be equal, so he is depicted as never using  language (krama Inggil) or sitting in front of his interlocutors. Bima did these two things (spoke in Inggil krama and sat down) only when he became a Resi in the Bima Suci play, and when he met Dewaruci. He is adept at playing Gada (mace), and has a variety of weapons, including: Paku Pancanaka, Rujakpala Gada, Alugara, Bargawa (big ax), and Bargawasta. While the types of powers he has include: Aji Bandungbandawasa, Aji Ketuglindhu, Aji Bayubraja and Aji Blabak Pangantol-antol.

Bima also has clothes that symbolize greatness, namely: Gelung Pudaksategal, Fertilizer Jarot Asem, Sumping Surengpati, Kelatbahu Candrakirana, Nagabanda Belt and Cinde Udaraga Pants. Some of the divine gifts he received included: Kampuh Cloth or Poleng Bintuluaji, Candrakirana Bracelets, Nagasasra Necklaces, Surengpati Sumping Fertilizer and Jarot Asem Pudak Fertilizers.

Wayang story

Raden Werkudara or Bima is the second son of Dewi Kunti and Prabu Pandudewanata. But he was actually the son of Batara Bayu and Dewi Kunti because Prabu Pandu could not produce offspring. This is the curse of Begawan Kimindama. However, due to Aji Adityaredhaya being owned by Dewi Kunti, the couple was able to have children.

At the time of its birth, its body is covered by a thin membrane that cannot be broken by any weapon. This made the couple Dewi Kunthi and Pandu very sad. At the suggestion of Begawan Abiyasa, Pandu then dumped the wrapped baby in the Mandalasara forest. For eight years the pack did not break and began to roll here and there so that the forest that had been lush became razed to the ground. This makes forest dwellers confused. In addition, the forest-dwelling jinn began to be disturbed, so Batari Durga, the queen of all spirits, reported to Batara Guru, the king of all gods. Then, the king of the gods ordered Batara Bayu, Batari Durga, and Gajah Sena, the son of Erawata, the elephant riding on Batara Indra, and accompanied by Batara Narada to come down and break the baby's wrapper. Before being solved, Batari Durga went into the wrapper and gave the baby clothes in the form of Poleng Bang Bintulu cloth (in real life, it is often found on the island of Bali as a dress for statues that are considered sacred (kain poleng = black and white plaid cloth), Candrakirana bracelet, Nagabanda necklace, Pupuk Jarot Asem and Surengpati Sumping (a kind of headdress). After fully dressed, Batari Durga came out of Bima's body, then Gajah Sena's turn to break the baby's wrapper. By Gajah Sena then the baby was hit by, was stabbed with its tusk and trampled underfoot. Strangely, instead of dying, the baby then fought back, after coming out of the pack. Once kicked, Gajah Sena immediately died and then died in the baby's body. Then the wrap from Werkudara was exhaled by Batara Bayu came to Begawan Sapwani's lap, who was then worshiped by the hermit as a mighty baby like Bima. Because Bima is the son of Batara Bayu, he has the power to control the wind.

Werkudara, who has a large body, has a courageous character, is firm, has a strong opinion, and has a firm faith. During his life Werkudara never spoke softly to anyone including his parents, gods, and teachers, except for Dewa Ruci, the true god, he spoke softly and wanted to worship.
During his life Werkudara studied with Resi Drona for inner training and soldiering, Begawan Krepa, and Prabu Baladewa for dexterity with the club. In studying Werkudara has always been the main rival for his cousin who is also the eldest from the Kauravas, namely Duryudana.
The Kauravas always wanted to get rid of the Pandavas because according to them the Pandavas were only a stumbling block for them to dominate the kingdom of Astina. The Kauravas think that the strength of the Pandavas lies in Werkudara because he is the strongest among the five Pandavas, so that one day on the cunning of Patih Sengkuni who masterminded the Kauravas planned to poison Werkudara. At that time when Bima was playing, Duryodhana called him and asked him to drink until he was drunk where the drink was poisoned. After Werkudara fell unconscious, he was carried by the Kauravas and put into the Jalatunda Well where there were thousands of poisonous snakes there. At that time, Sang Hyang Nagaraja came, the ruler of the Jalatunda Well to help Werkudara, then Werkudara was given the power to be immune to anything and got a new name from San Hyang Nagaraja, namely Bondan Peksajandu.

The mind of the Kauravas to get rid of the Pandavas had not been exhausted, they then challenged Yudhisthira to weigh in who would win Astina completely. Of course the Pandavas would lose because of one hundred and one against five, but Werkudara had reason, he asked his brother to leave a little space for him. Werkudara then took a few steps back, then jumped and stepped on the place left by his brother, just at that moment, the Kauravas who sat at the very end were thrown away. The Kauravas who were thrown to the other side of the country were later named in Baratayuda "Ratu Sewu Negara." Among them are Prabu Bogadenta from the Turilaya kingdom, Prabu Gardapati from the Bukasapta kingdom, Prabu Gardapura who is the companion of Prabu Gardapati as Prabu Anom, Prabu Widandini from the Purantura kingdom, and Kartamarma from the Banyutinalang kingdom. This story is packaged in a play called Pandawa Timbang.

Not satisfied with their efforts, the Kauravas again wanted to harm the Pandavas through Sengkuni's cunning tactics. This time the Pandavas were invited to come to Amarta's handover of power and were given a boarding house made of wood called Bale Sigala-gala. The handover ceremony was delayed until late at night and the Pandavas were again drunk. After the Pandavas fell asleep, only Bima was still awake because Bima refused to join in drinking liquor. In the middle of the night, the Kauravas who thought the Pandavas had slept began to burn the guesthouse. Previously Arjuna allowed six beggars to sleep and eat in the guesthouse out of pity. When the fire broke out, Bima immediately carried his mother, brother, and sister into the tunnel that had been made by Yamawidura, who knew the cunning of the Kauravas. They were then guided by the white garangan who was the incarnation of Sang Hyang Antaboga. Arrived in heaven Sapta Pratala. Here Werkudara then met and married Sang Hyang Antaboga's daughter, Dewi Nagagini. From that marriage they had a son who would later become very powerful and an expert in war in the land named Antareja. After the Pandavas left the heaven of Sapta Pratala, they entered the forest. In the middle of the forest, the Pandavas met Prabu Arimba who was the son of Prabu Tremboko who had been killed by Prabu Pandu at the instigation of Sengkuni. Knowing the origin of the Pandavas, Prabu Arimba then wanted to kill them, but was repelled and eventually died at the hands of Werkudara. However, the younger brother of King Arimba did not hate him but instead put his heart on Werkudara. Before he died, Prabu Arimba entrusted his sister, Dewi Arimbi, to Werkudara. Because Arimbi is a rakseksi, Werkudara rejects his love. Then Dewi Kunti, who saw the sincerity of Dewi Arimbi's love, said, "Ouch ayune, this boy ..." (Oh, how beautiful this child is..!) Suddenly, the ugly Dewi Arimbi became beautiful and was then married to Werkudara. The couple finally had a son who was an expert in air warfare, named Gatotkaca. Gatotkaca then also appointed as king in Pringgandani as a replacement for his uncle, Prabu Arimba.

While in the forest after the Bale Sigala-gala incident, his mother asked Werkudara and Arjuna to find two packets of rice for hungry Nakula and Sadewa. Werkudara came to a country called the Kingdom of Manahilan and there he met Rishi Hijrapa and his wife who was crying. When asked why, they replied that their only son had a turn to be eaten by the king of the land. The king of the country, named Prabu Baka or Prabu Dawaka, was fond of preying on humans. Without thinking, Werkudara immediately offered to replace the hermit's son. When eaten by Prabu Baka, it was not the body of Werkudara that was torn but the teeth of Prabu Baka were broken. This caused the wrath of King Baka. But in the fight against Werkudara, Prabu Baka died and all the people rejoiced because their king who liked to prey on humans had died. By the people of the country Werkudara will be made king, but Werkudara refuses. When asked what kind of reward he wanted to get, Werkudara said he only wanted two packs of rice. Then after getting the rice, Werkudara returned to the forest and later the hermit family was willing to become a sacrifice for the glory of the Pandavas in Baratayuda Jayabinangun. Meanwhile Arjuna also managed to get two packets of rice from the mercy of people. Dewi Kunti also said "Arjuna, eat the rice yourself!" Dewi Kunti always taught that in this life we should not accept anything from someone's pity.

Besides Gatotkaca and Antareja, Werkudara also has a son who is an expert in underwater warfare, namely Antasena, the son of Bima and Dewi Urangayu, the daughter of Hyang Mintuna, the god who rules fresh water. The elders of Astina felt sad because they thought the Pandavas had died because they found six bodies in the burned-out guesthouse. The happy Kauravas then realized that the Pandavas were still alive when they took part in the contest for Dewi Drupadi. The Pandavas represented by Werkudara can win the competition by killing Gandamana. At the same time, Sengkuni and Jayajatra were also present who participated in the contest representing Resi Drona but lost. From Gandamana, Werkudara got the teachings of Wungkal Bener, and the teachings of Bandung Bandawasa. After winning the competition, Werkudara presented Dewi Drupadi to his brother, Puntadewa.

After learning that the Pandavas were still alive, Astina's elders such as Resi Bhishma, Resi Drona, and Yamawidura urged Prabu Destarastra to give Pamdawa the Wanamarta forest, with the aim that the Kurawa and Pandavas would not unite and avoid civil war. Finally Destarastra agreed. The Pandavas were then rewarded with the famous Wanamarta forest. And with great effort they were finally able to establish an empire called Amarta. Werkudara also managed to defeat the younger brother of the king of the genie, Prabu Yudistira, who resided in Jodipati named Dandun Wacana. Dadun Wacana then merged into Werkudara's body. Then, Werkudara got the inheritance of Gada Lukitasari besides that, Werkudara also got the name Dandun Wacana. As the king of Jodipati, Werkudara had the title Prabu Jayapusaka with Crow Bongkol as his governor. Werkudara was also a king in Gilingwesi with the title Prabu Tugu Wasesa. When the Pandavas lost in a gambling game with the Kauravas, the Pandavas had to live as exiles for 12 years in the forest and 1 year in disguise. In this disguise, Werkudara disguised himself as a butcher or palace cook in the land of Wiratha with the name Butcher Abilawa. There he was credited with killing Kencakarupa, Rupakenca and Rajamala who aimed to rebel. In fact, he killed Kencakarupa and Rupakenca on the grounds that they both wanted to rape Salindri, who was none other than the wife of his sister, Puntadewa, Dewi Drupadi who was in disguise.

Once Bima was asked by his teacher, Resi Drona, to look for Tirta Prawitasari or the water of life at the bottom of the ocean. Actually Tirta Prawitasari does not exist at the bottom of the ocean but is at the bottom of every human heart and the teacher's orders are just a trap planned by Sengkuni using Drona Resi. But Bima lived it in earnest. He searched for Prawitasari's water to the bottom of the ocean in the South Sea. On his way he met two large giants who were blocking him. The two giants were named Rukmuka and Rukmakala who were incarnations of Batara Indra and Batara Bayu who were sworn in by Batara Guru to become giants. After successfully killing the two monsters and after the giant changed back to its original form and returned to heaven, Werkudara continued his journey. Arriving at the vast ocean he was again attacked by a dragon named Naga Nemburnawa. With his claws, he tore the dragon's belly. After that Werkudara just stood still above the ocean. It was here that he met his true god, Dewa Ruci. By Dewa Ruci, Werkudara was then asked to enter the ear hole of the dwarf god. Then Werkudara came in and got a lecture about the meaning of life. He also saw an area that was peaceful, safe, and serene. After that Werkudara became a priest with the title Begawan Bima Suci and taught what he had learned from Dewa Ruci.

Werkudara has also assisted in the coup action to be carried out by Prabu Anom Kangsa in the country of Mandura. Kangsa was the son of Dewi Maerah, the consort of King Basudewa, and King Gorawangsa of Guwabarong who was disguised as Basudewa. At that time Kangsa wanted to get rid of Basudewa's sons, namely Narayana (later to become Krishna), Kakrasana (later to become Baladewa, the king of his father's successor) and Dewi Lara Ireng (later to become Arjuna's wife named Wara Sumbadra). In the play entitled Kangsa Adu Jago, Werkudara managed to get rid of Patih Suratimantra and Kangsa himself was killed by Basudewa's sons, Kakrasana and Narayana. Since then the kinship between the Pandavas and Krishna and Balarama became closer. In Bima Kacep's play, Werkudara becomes a hermit to get the inspiration for victory in Bharatayuddha. While being imprisoned, Dewi Uma came who was attracted by the valor of the Werkudara. They then practice romance. Unfortunately, Batara Guru, Dewi Uma's husband, caught them. By Batara Guru, Werkudara's genitals were cut using As Jaludara which later became the heirloom of a pest repellent named Angking Gobel. From his relationship with Dewi Uma, Bima has another daughter named Bimandari. This play is rarely performed. And some of the puppeteers don't even know this story.

In addition to the Ajian inherited by Gandamana, Werkudara also has Aji Blabak Pangtol-antol and Aji Taplindu. In terms of weapons, Werkudara has a mainstay weapon, namely the Gada Rujak Polo. In addition, Werkudara also has the Bargawa heirloom in the form of an ax and the Bargawastra in the form of an arrow. The arrows cannot be used up because every time they are used, the arrows will return to their owner. He had also met Anoman, Bayu's only brother. There they exchanged knowledge, where Werkudara got the Science of Age Division from Anoman and Anoman got Literature Science from Jendra Hayuningrat. Previously, the spirit of Kumbakarna, who was still curious and wanted to achieve perfection, also fused in Raden Werkudara's left thigh in Wahyu Makutarama's story, which made the Panegak Pandawa knight stronger. In the great war Baratayuda Jayabinangun Werkudara managed to kill many Kurawa warriors, including, Raden Dursasana, the second son of the Kauravas whom he brutally killed on the 16th day of Baratayuda to pay off Drupadi's oath that he would only bun and wash his hair after washing it with Dursasana's blood after the daughter of Pancala was abused when the Pandavas lose playing dice. Bima also killed Prabu Duryudana's other brothers, such as Gardapati on the third day of Baratyuda, Kartamarma, after Baratayuda, and many others. Werkudara also killed Patih Sengkuni on the 17th day by tearing his skin from the anus to his mouth to pay off his mother's oath that she would not bloat if she did not wear Sengkuni's skin when Princess Mandura abused Sengkuni during the distribution of tuning oil. This is also in accordance with Gandamana's curse that Sengkuni had framed to seize the position of Mahapatih Astina that Sengkuni would die with a skinned body.

On the last day of Bharatayuddha, all of Astina's officers had died, only Werkudara's greatest rival remained, namely the king of Astina himself, Prabu Duryudana. This fight was refereed by Prabu Baladewa himself who was the teacher of the two students with the rules that they could only hit the body from the waist up. In that fight Duryodhana's body was immune and only his left thigh was not exposed to tuning oil, because he did not want to open the cloth covering his genitals which was still covering his left thigh when Dewi Gendari applied the oil to Duryodhana's body. Many people misinterpret this thigh by saying the left calf. Actually the correct one is the thigh because in Javanese wentis is the thigh, not the calf. Duryudana who tried to hit Werkudara's left thigh failed because in Werkudara's left thigh resided the spirit of Kumbakarna which caused Bima's left thigh to become very strong.

Fortunately Arjuna from a distance signaled by patting his left thigh. Werkudara who was alert with his brother's signal immediately slammed his club on Duryodhana's left thigh, in two strokes Duryodhana was dying, by Werkudara, Duryodhana was then killed by smashing his face so that it was shapeless Baladewa who saw this thought Werkudara had cheated and wanted to punish him, but after Prabu Krishna's explanation of the fraud committed by Duryodhana and the curse of Begawan Maetreya finally Prabu Baladewa wanted to forgive him. When Begawan Maetreya came to Duryodhana and gave advice on giving half a kingdom to the Pandavas, Duryodhana just sat down and said, a priest should only think if the king asks for it, patting his left thigh. For Begawan Maetreya this was considered an insult, he then cursed King Duryodhana to die with a crushed left thigh.

After Bharatayuddha war was over, the Pandavas came to see King Destarastra and the other Astina elders. It turned out that Destarastra still held a grudge against Werkudara who heard that many of his sons had died at the hands of Werkudara, especially Dursasana who he killed cruelly. When the Pandavas came to pay homage to Destarastra, Destarastra secretly recited the Aji Lebursaketi mantra to destroy Werkudara, however, Prabu Kresna who knew about it pushed Werkudara aside so that the stone statue was affected by the aji-aji. Immediately, the statue was crushed to ashes. Destarastra later admitted his mistake and he withdrew from society and lived as a hermit in the forest with his wife and Dewi Kunti. Some puppet standards say that Prabu Destarastra was killed before the Baratayuda war broke out when Krishna became the Pandavas' ambassador to Astina. At that time he was trampled to death by his sons who were running for fear of the anger of King Krishna who had become a Brahala.

In popular culture 

 Central haracter in Randamoozham novel written by M T Vasudevan Nair
 In the Hindi film Mahabharat (1965), Dara Singh portrayed the character.
 In Hindi television series Mahabharat (1988) and Mahabharat Katha (1997), Praveen Kumar portrayed the character.
 In the Hindi television series Shri Krishna (1993), Mahendra Ghule portrayed the character.
In the Hindi television series Draupadi (2001), Vindu Dara Singh played the character.
In the Hindi television series Kahaani Hamaaray Mahaabhaarat Ki (2008), Chetan Hansraj played the character.
 The character of Bheem from the Indian animation series Chhota Bheem is inspired by Mahabharata's character.
 In the Hindi television series Mahabharat (2013), Saurav Gurjar portrayed the character.
 Sunny Deol has also voiced the character in the Hindi animation film Mahabharat.
In the Hindi television series Dharmakshetra (2014) Dinesh Mehta played the character.
In the Hindi television series Suryaputra Karn (2015) Ketan Karande portrayed the character.
In the Hindi television series RadhaKrishn, Zuber Ali is currently portraying the character.

Footnotes

External links

Characters in the Mahabharata